Aristodama of Smyrna was a 3rd century BCE itinerant poet of ancient Ionia. None of her works have survived to the present; we know of her only through inscriptions found in the mainland Greek cities of Lamia and Chaleion. There she and her brother were granted citizenship and other privileges in recognition of her poetic skill and performance. Chaleion honoured her for several readings of an epic (that they may have commissioned from her) narrating the traditions of their Aetolian ancestors. The earliest known such honour granted to a woman, it provides evidence of the opportunities of education and advancement for women in the Hellenistic period. That Aristodama must have lived sometime after 217 BCE is deduced because the contemporary Agetas of Callipolis is mentioned in the Lamia inscription as an Aetolian general.

References

External links
  - the two inscriptions in French translation by M.Dana

Year of death unknown
3rd-century BC Greek people
Ionic Greek poets
Ancient Greek women poets
3rd-century BC women writers
3rd-century BC writers
3rd-century BC Greek women